Raymond "Smoky" Owens (1912 – September 7, 1942) was an American baseball pitcher in the Negro leagues. He played from 1939 to 1942 with the Cleveland Bears, St. Louis Stars, and the Cincinnati Clowns. He was selected to the second 1939 East-West All-Star Game. Owens died in a car accident on September 7, 1942. Ulysses Brown also died, while Eugene Bremmer, Herman Watts, Alonzo Boone, and Wilbur Hayes were also injured.

References

External links
 and Seamheads

1912 births
1942 deaths
Road incident deaths in Ohio
Cincinnati Clowns players
Cleveland Bears players
St. Louis Stars (baseball) players
Baseball players from Alabama
20th-century African-American sportspeople
Baseball pitchers